Yoann Étienne (born 19 May 1997) is a French professional footballer who plays as a left-back for Lorient.

Professional career
On 6 April 2018, Etienne signed his first professional contract with AS Monaco FC for three years. On 16 June 2018, he was loaned to Cercle Brugge for the 2018-19 season. Etienne made his professional debut in a 0-0 Belgian First Division A tie with Sint-Truiden on 28 July 2018. On 5 October 2021, he transferred to the Ligue 1 club Lorient.

Personal life
Born in France, Etienne is of Haitian descent.

References

External links
 Soccerway Profile
 AS Monaco Profile

1997 births
Living people
Footballers from Paris
French footballers
French expatriate sportspeople in Monaco
French sportspeople of Haitian descent
AS Monaco FC players
Cercle Brugge K.S.V. players
FC Lorient players
Ligue 1 players
Belgian Pro League players
Championnat National 2 players
Association football fullbacks
French expatriate footballers
French expatriate sportspeople in Belgium
Expatriate footballers in Belgium